The Ambassador Extraordinary and Plenipotentiary of Ukraine to Moldova is the ambassador of Ukraine to Moldova. The current ambassador is Marko Shevchenko. He assumed the position in 2019. 

The first Ukrainian ambassador to Moldova assumed his post in 1999, the same year a Ukrainian embassy opened in Chisinau.

List of ambassadors

Ukraine
 1993–1994 Vitaliy Boiko
 1994–1996 Yevhen Levytsky
 1996–2000 Ivan Hnatyshyn
 2000–2007 Petro Chalyi
 2007–2014 Serhiy Pyrozhkov
 2014–2015 Hennadiy Altukhov
 2015–2019 Ivan Hnatyshyn
 Since 2019 Marko Shevchenko

References

External links 
  Embassy of Ukraine to Moldova: Previous Ambassadors

 
Moldova
Ukraine